MeatEater is a non-fiction outdoors hunting television series in the United States on Netflix starring Steven Rinella. The show first aired on January 1, 2012 and is produced by Zero Point Zero Production.

Episodes 
<onlyinclude>

Season 1 (2012)

Season 2 (2012)

Season 3 (2013)

Season 4 (2014)

Season 5 (2015)

Season 6 (2016)

Season 7 (2018)

Season 8 (2019)

Season 9 (2020)

Season 10 (2021)

Awards and nominations 
In 2013, MeatEater won a Sportsman Choice Award for Best New Series.

Also in 2013, MeatEater was nominated for a James Beard Foundation Award for Best Television Program, On Location.

In 2014, MeatEater won a Sportsman Choice Award for Best Overall Production.

In 2016, MeatEater won a Sportsman Choice Award for Best Small Game Episode for "Steve Makes the Team: Kentucky Small Game".

References

External links 
 

American sports television series
2012 American television series debuts
2010s American reality television series
Hunting in the United States
English-language Netflix original programming
2020s American reality television series